Peter H. Quinn (May 1873 – April 19, 1934) was a United States Army soldier received the Medal of Honor for actions on May 13, 1899, during the Philippine–American War.  Private Quinn is buried in Arlington National Cemetery.

Medal of Honor citation
Rank and organization: Private, Company L, 4th U.S. Cavalry. Place and date: At San Miguel de Mayumo, Luzon, Philippine Islands, May 13, 1899. Entered service at: San Francisco, California. Birth: San Francisco, California. Date of issue: June 6, 1906.

Citation:

With 11 other scouts without waiting for the supporting battalion to aid them or to get into a position to do so, charged over a distance of about 150 yards and completely routed about 300 of the enemy who were in line and in a position that could only be carried by a frontal attack.

See also
List of Medal of Honor recipients

Notes

References
 

1873 births
1931 deaths
United States Army Medal of Honor recipients
American military personnel of the Philippine–American War
United States Army soldiers
People from San Francisco
Burials at Arlington National Cemetery
Philippine–American War recipients of the Medal of Honor